Samuel Glasstone (3 May 1897 – 16 November 1986) was a British-born American academic and writer of scientific books.  He authored over 40 popular textbooks on physical chemistry and electrochemistry, reaction rates, nuclear weapons effects, nuclear reactor engineering, Mars, space sciences, the environmental effects of nuclear energy and nuclear testing.

Early life 
Glasstone was born on 3 May 1897 in London. He received two doctorates, in 1922 and 1926 (PhD and DSc), in chemistry at London University. Glasstone discovered the C–H···O interaction in 1937. After several academic appointments in England, he moved to the US in 1939 and became a naturalized citizen in 1944.

Publications 
His book The Effects of Nuclear Weapons, co-authored with Philip J. Dolan, has appeared in three editions: 1957, 1962, and 1977 (originally titled The Effects of Atomic Weapons), and documented the effects of nuclear explosions. He published several important texts on physical chemistry and theoretical chemistry, including the very popular 'A textbook of Physical Chemistry' (1943), and 'Elements of Physical Chemistry' (1960).

References

 on AtomicArchive.com website

Technical writers
1897 births
Manhattan Project people
American science writers
1986 deaths
American physical chemists
British emigrants to the United States